The Brazilian singer Mallu Magalhães toured Brazil in 2008 and 2010, and briefly visited Portugal in January 2009. These tours were to support her first two studio albums, Mallu Magalhães (2008) and Mallu Magalhães (2009).

The show consisted of acoustic versions of songs from the album supported and some other singers. Mallu used some props, such as goggles and face painting.

2008

Setlist

Main setlist

"It Ain´t Me Babe" (cover of Bob Dylan)
"Get to Denmark"
"Have You Ever"
"You Know You´ve Got"
"Meia Colorida"
"Vanguart"
"Her Day Will Come"
"It Takes Two to Tango"
"Girassóis"
"Folsom Prison Blues" (cover of Johnny Cash)
"Town of Rock and Roll"
"J1"
"Faz"
"O Preço da Flor"
"Noil"
"Sualk"
"Dry Freezing Tongue"
"I do Believe"
"Angelina, Angelina"
"Don't You Look Back"
"Tchubaruba"
"My Honey"
"You Always Say"
"Sweet Mom"

Festival setlist

"Vanguart"
"J1"
"O Preço da Flor"
"Tchubaruba"

Tour dates

Broadcasts and recordings

The October 7, 2008 show in São Paulo was recorded for the Mallu Magalhães Live DVD.

2010

Setlist

Festival setlist

"Vanguart"
"J1"
"O Preço da Flor"
"Tchubaruba"
"Shine Yellow"
"Pode Vir Quente Que Estou Fervendo" (cover Erasmo Carlos)
"É Você Que Tem"

Tour dates

References

Lists of concert tours